Sunil Ramsay de Silva Wettimuny (born 2 February 1949), or Sunil Wettimuny, is a former Sri Lankan cricketer who played three One Day International (ODI) matches in the Cricket World Cup tournaments of 1975 and 1979 as an opening batsman.

Sunil is the elder brother of two other Sri Lankan cricketers, Mithra and Sidath.
After his cricketing career ended, he became a commercial pilot. He was the pilot of the special flight which brought the 1996 World cup winning team from Lahore to Sri Lanka.

References

External links

1949 births
Living people
Alumni of Ananda College
Sri Lankan cricketers
Sri Lanka One Day International cricketers
All-Ceylon cricketers
Cricketers at the 1975 Cricket World Cup
Cricketers at the 1979 Cricket World Cup